Diogo Rocha may refer to:

 Diogo da Rocha (fl. 1525), Portuguese explorer
 Diogo Rocha (tennis) (born 1984), Portuguese tennis player
 Diogo Rocha (footballer) (born 1995), known as "Rochinha", Portuguese football attacking midfielder for Sporting

See also
 Diego Rocha (born 2001), American soccer defender for Charlotte Independence